Meat-free days or veggiedays are declared to discourage or prohibit the consumption of meat on certain days of the week. Mondays and Fridays are the most popular days. There are also movements encouraging people giving up meat on a weekly, monthly, or permanent basis.

History 

Abstention from meat, other than fish, was historically done for religious reasons (e.g. the Friday Fast). In the Methodist Church, on Fridays, especially those of Lent, "abstinence from meat one day a week is a universal act of penitence". Anglicans (Episcopalians) and Roman Catholics also traditionally observe Friday as a meat-free day. Historically, Anglican and Catholic countries enforced prohibitions on eating meat, other than fish, on certain days of Lent. In England, for example, "butchers and victuallers were bound by heavy recognizances not to slaughter or sell meat on the weekly 'fish days', Friday and Saturday." In the Eastern Orthodox Church, Wednesdays and Fridays are meat-free days. In the Lutheran Church, Fridays and Saturdays are historically considered meat-free days. In addition to the Fridays of the year, in Western Christianity, Ash Wednesday—the first day of the repentance themed season of Lent—is a traditional day of fasting and abstinence from meat.

Among East Asian Buddhists, vegetarian Buddhist cuisine was eaten on days tied to the phases of the moon known as Uposatha.

Meat-free days have also been observed due to wartime rationing (e.g. Meatless Tuesdays in Canada and the United States—which also observed Wheatless Wednesdays—during World War I) or in states with failing economies.

In the People's Republic of Poland, meat-free days were encouraged by the government due to market forces. They were aimed at limiting meat consumption, primarily in favour of flour-based foods. The meat-free day was traditionally Friday, Monday or Wednesday.

Ecology and society 
Attempts to reintroduce meat-free days are part of a campaign to reduce anthropogenic climate change and improve human health and animal welfare by reducing factory farming and promoting vegetarianism or veganism.

Africa

South Africa 
 Cape Town

Asia

Hong Kong 
 Daily "Meat Free Hong Kong Meetup"

India 
  International Meatless Day, also called the 'International Vegetarian Day', 25 November, birthday of Sadhu T.L. Vaswani, who was an Indian educationist who started the Mira development for improving Indian instructional framework, beginning with settling St. Mira's School in Hyderabad, Sindh. The campaign for International Meatless Day was begun in 1986 by the Sadhu Vaswani Mission, an association for social administration for the abused and underprivileged.

Pakistan 
 Reportedly, Meatless Tuesdays and Wednesdays were observed in Pakistan, from Benazir Bhutto's era in the 1990s through part of the 21st century.

Singapore 
 Thursday, coordinated by the Vegetarian Society (Singapore)

Taiwan 
 Meat-free Mondays in Taipei

Europe

Belgium 
 Ghent
 Hasselt
 Mechelen

Germany 
 Bremen
 During the federal elections in 2013, the German green party Bündnis '90/Die Grünen campaigned with a so-called "veggie day" in their manifesto, which resulted in a public outburst over "paternalism".

Norway 
 the Norwegian Armed Forces

Switzerland 
 Thursdays, coordinated by Swissveg

North America

United States 
 Los Angeles has declared all Mondays "Meatless Mondays," citing actions by Baltimore public-school system, Oakland, California Unified School District and school districts in Arlington, Virginia, Oneida, New York, Longmont, Colorado; the cities of San Francisco, Takoma Park and Annapolis, Maryland, Marin County, California and the District of Columbia Council.

See also 
 Awareness day
 Friday Fast
 List of food days
 Meatless Monday
 List of vegetarian festivals
 Vegetarian week
 Vegan school meal
 World Vegan Day
 World Vegetarian Day

References 

Vegetarianism
Asceticism
Christian fasting
Meat
Rationing